Thomas V. Morris (born 1952), is an American philosopher. He is a former professor of philosophy at the University of Notre Dame, Indiana. He is a founder of the Morris Institute for Human Values, and author of several books. He is also a business and motivational speaker, applying philosophical themes and concepts to business and professional life.

Morris sees the past century's focus on technical efforts in analytic philosophy as having given philosophy the image of an arcane or irrelevant endeavor. He has attempted to make philosophy widely accessible, rediscovering the practical side of philosophy, and introducing people to the themes and philosophers.

Early life
Morris was born and grew up in North Carolina. Morris is an avid rock guitarist. He graduated from the University of North Carolina at Chapel Hill, where he was a Morehead Scholar, and holds a Ph.D. in Philosophy and Religious Studies from Yale University. UNC has honored him with the "Distinguished Young Alumnus Award".

Academia
For fifteen years Morris served as a professor of philosophy at the University of Notre Dame, where he attempted to transform esoteric concepts and obscure academic texts into lively and fun learning experiences. As an example, he arranged for the school marching band to play in class to motivate students who were about to take a test in one of his philosophy classes.

Morris has made academic contributions to the philosophy of religion and is considered an important contributor to analytic discussions of many critical areas in both philosophy and theology. One of his earliest publications remains a classic text in contemporary philosophical theology, The Logic of God Incarnate. He has also written other works in general philosophy, as well as in philosophical theology, such as Anselmian Explorations: Essays in Philosophical Theology (1987), Divine and Human Action: Essays in the Metaphysics of Theism (1988), Philosophy and the Christian Faith (1988), Our Idea of God (1991), and God and the Philosophers: The Reconciliation of Faith and Reason.

Popular philosophy and motivational speaking
Morris' books include Francis Schaeffer's Apologetics: A Critique, Understanding Identity Statements, The Logic of God Incarnate, Anselmian Explorations, The Concept of God, Our Idea of God, The Bluffer's Guide to Philosophy, Philosophy and the Christian Faith, Divine and Human Action, Our Idea of God, Making Sense of It All, God and the Philosophers, Philosophy for Dummies, True Success, The Art of Achievement, If Aristotle Ran General Motors, The Stoic Art of Living, Superheroes and Philosophy, and his latest text, If Harry Potter Ran General Electric.

Morris seeks to make philosophy interesting, intelligible, and practical to the ordinary person. Early in his academic career, he authored a privately circulated project, The Bluffer's Guide to Philosophy and the popular Making Sense of It All: Pascal and the Meaning of Life - two books that provide the amateur philosopher easy access to philosophical works and concepts.

In Making Sense of It All, Morris examined one of the great Christian thinkers of all time, Blaise Pascal. In this book, Morris highlighted Pascal's observation that diversion is one of the greatest spiritual dangers of our age. Morris argues that diversion can only keep the "big questions" about the meaning of life at bay for so long. He points out that people are hungry to engage in intelligent dialogue about the purpose and meaning of life. He draws from Pascal's view in the Pensées that people need to understand the larger context of their lives in order to determine how to live. As people confront ethical dilemmas in everyday life, they begin to ask more probing questions that eventually lead to ultimate questions about life, death, morality, value, meaning, and purpose.

Recently, Morris has continued to popularize philosophy and foster reflections on life and the meaning of it all in such works as Philosophy for Dummies, True Success, If Aristotle Ran General Motors, The Art of Achievement, and The Stoic Art of Living.  In The Stoic Art of Living, he relates the ideas of Epictetus, Seneca and Marcus Aurelius, and transforms them into intelligible concepts and practical applications to contemporary life.

Castellano et al. describe If Aristotle Ran General Motors as "compelling" and "persuasive" in arguing that in addition to codes of conduct and ethical guidelines, the creation of an ethical workplace climate requires "socially harmonious relationships" to be embedded in practice.

Morris' most recent application of philosophy to contemporary culture is If Harry Potter Ran General Electric. In this work, he explored the philosophical implications and themes from the popular children's classics by J.K. Rowling and applied them to lessons in leadership and ethics. Morris also edited a volume of new essays from world philosophers and some of the top pop culture superhero comic book writers, entitled Superheroes and Philosophy, with his son Matt Morris. In addition to his writing and lectures, Morris has appeared on television in a segment on ethics for The Learning Channel, and as the philosophic face of Winnie the Pooh for Disney Home Video. He has made guest appearances on such network shows as NBC's Today Show and Regis Philbin's morning show.

Morris ventured out to the business world as founder and chairman of the Morris Institute for Human Values. The Institute is based in Wilmington, North Carolina, where he now lives.

See also
American philosophy
List of American philosophers

References

External links
TomVMorris

1952 births
Living people
20th-century American philosophers
Christian philosophers
American motivational speakers
American motivational writers
University of Notre Dame faculty
People from North Carolina